Events from the year 1898 in Canada.

Incumbents

Crown 
 Monarch – Victoria

Federal government 
 Governor General – John Hamilton-Gordon, 7th Earl of Aberdeen (until November 12) then Gilbert Elliot-Murray-Kynynmound, 4th Earl of Minto 
 Prime Minister – Wilfrid Laurier
 Chief Justice – Samuel Henry Strong (Ontario)
 Parliament – 8th

Provincial governments

Lieutenant governors 
Lieutenant Governor of British Columbia – Thomas Robert McInnes
Lieutenant Governor of Manitoba – James Colebrooke Patterson
Lieutenant Governor of New Brunswick – Jabez Bunting Snowball 
Lieutenant Governor of Nova Scotia – Malachy Bowes Daly
Lieutenant Governor of Ontario – Oliver Mowat 
Lieutenant Governor of Prince Edward Island – George William Howlan
Lieutenant Governor of Quebec – Joseph-Adolphe Chapleau (until January 20) then Louis-Amable Jetté

Premiers 
Premier of British Columbia – John Herbert Turner (until August 15) then Charles Augustus Semlin
Premier of Manitoba – Thomas Greenway 
Premier of New Brunswick – Henry Emmerson 
Premier of Nova Scotia – George Henry Murray 
Premier of Ontario – Arthur Sturgis Hardy
Premier of Prince Edward Island – Alexander Warburton (until August 1) then Donald Farquharson 
Premier of Quebec – Félix-Gabriel Marchand

Territorial governments

Commissioners 
 Commissioner of Yukon – James Morrow Walsh (until July 5) then William Ogilvie

Lieutenant governors 
 Lieutenant Governor of Keewatin – James Colebrooke Patterson
 Lieutenant Governor of the North-West Territories – Charles Herbert Mackintosh (until May 30) then Malcolm Colin Cameron (May 30 to September 26) then Amédée E. Forget (from October 4)

Premiers 
 Premier of North-West Territories – Frederick Haultain

Events
March 1 – 1898 Ontario election: A. S. Hardy's Liberals win a majority
June 13 – Yukon becomes a distinct territory from the North-West Territories
July 29 – White Pass and Yukon Route opens (Skagway–Whitehorse)
August – Donald Farquharson becomes Premier of Prince Edward Island, replacing A. B. Warburton
August 8 – John Herbert Turner is dismissed as premier of British Columbia
August 15 – Charles Semlin becomes premier of British Columbia
September 11 – New Westminster, British Columbia destroyed by fire.
September 29 – The Canadian referendum on the prohibition of alcohol.
November 4 – The fourth election of the North-West Legislative Assembly

Full date unknown
The Parliament of Canada passes the Quebec Boundary Extension Act, expanding the provincial boundaries northward to include the lands of the aboriginal Cree.
Kit Coleman covers the Spanish–American War as Canada's first female war correspondent

Arts and literature

Births
May 20 – Paul Gouin, politician (d.1976)
May 27 – William Arthur Irwin, journalist
July 7 – Hugh Llewellyn Keenleyside, diplomat, civil servant and 5th Commissioner of the Northwest Territories (d.1992)
July 17 – Osmond Borradaile, cameraman, cinematographer and veteran of First and Second World War (d.1999)
August 23 – Brooke Claxton, politician and Minister (d.1960)
August 27 – Gaspard Fauteux, politician, Speaker of the House of Commons of Canada and Lieutenant-Governor of Quebec (d.1963)
August 30 – Gleason Belzile, politician (d.1950)
November 9 – Emmett Matthew Hall, jurist, civil libertarian and Supreme Court justice (d.1995)
December 1 – Stuart Garson, politician, Minister and 12th Premier of Manitoba (d.1977)
December 15 – George Lawrence Price, last Commonwealth casualty of World War I (d.1918)

Full date unknown
Maurice Spector, Chairman of the Communist Party of Canada (d.1968)

Deaths

January 1 – John Arthur Fraser, artist (b.1838)
February 15 – Wilfrid Prévost, lawyer and politician (b.1832)
March 7 – Theodore Davie, lawyer, politician and 9th Premier of British Columbia (b.1852)
May 1 – Nazaire-Nicolas Olivier, lawyer and politician (b. c1860)
May 13 – François Bourassa, farmer and politician (b.1813)

April 12 – Elzéar-Alexandre Taschereau, Archbishop of Quebec (b.1820)
June 13 – Joseph-Adolphe Chapleau, lawyer, politician and 5th Premier of Quebec (b.1840)
July 14 – Louis-François Richer Laflèche, diocese of Trois-Rivières (b.1818)
August 24 – Casimir Gzowski, engineer (b.1813)

Historical documents
Federal plebiscite on prohibition finds apathetic electorate (compared to general election turnout) delivers small majority in favour

Touring U.S. farmers find paradise of meadows, prairies and woodlands in Saskatchewan

Questionable building standards lead to fatal collapse of city hall floor in London, Ontario

See also 
 List of Canadian films

References 

 
Years of the 19th century in Canada
Canada
1898 in North America